Anuradha (born Sulochana Devi) is an Indian film and television actress. She was mainly active in the 1980s and 1990s. She was known for her item numbers. She has acted in Tamil, Kannada, Malayalam, Telugu, Hindi and Oriya-language films.

Career
Sulochana was introduced to the film industry by director K. G. George at the age of 13. Even at that age she was very tall, he gave her the name Anuradha. She was the tallest actress at that time. She started off as a heroine and later moved on to doing item numbers. Even with that imposing height, Anuradha could act in over 700 films, which is a great achievement even when most of her co-actors or heroes were far shorter than her.  She is trained in martial arts and she did her action roles without any dupe. She was a motorcycle rider, who rode Java, Enfield bullet and other motorcycles. She was also seen in few Sun TV serials, including Thangam, Kannana kanne, Muthaaramand Deivamagal.

Personal life
Anruadha was born to Krishna Kumar, a choreographer, and Saroja Devi, a hairdresser for actresses in films. Her father is a Marathi and her mother is from Andhra Pradesh. She was married to Sathish Kumar in 1987, who was a dance director. They had two children Abhinayashree (born 1988) and Kalicharan (born 1991), who both have appeared as actresses.

However, Kumar met with a motorcycle accident on 7 November 1996, which caused massive damage to his brain and he died in 2007 due to heart attack.

Partial filmography

Films

Tamil

 Gethu (2016)
 Super Da (2004)
 Winner (2003)
 Ivan (2002)
 Thedinen Vanthathu (1997)
 Dhinamum Ennai Gavani (1997)
 The Terrorist (1997)
 Rajali (1996)
 Chinna Mani (1995)
 Ponmaalai Pozhudhu (1993)
 Sathiyam Adhu Nichayam (1992)
 Vanakkam Vathiyare (1991)
 Pudhu Mappillai (1989)
 Sangu Pushpangal (1989)
 Rettai Kuzhal Thuppaki (1989)
 Thendral Puyalanadhu (1989)
 Veerapandiyan (1987)
 Raja Mariyadhai (1987)
 Makkal En Pakkam (1987)
 Anjatha Singam (1987)
 Thangachi (1987)
 Kalyana Kacheri (1987)
 Solvathellam Unmai (1987)
 Thazhuvatha Kaigal (1986)
 Meendum Pallavi (1986)
 Enakku Nane Needipathi (1986)
 Kaithiyin Theerpu (1986)
 Kaithi Rani (1986)
 Mahasakthi Mariamman (1986)
 Viduthalai (1986)
 Jeevanathi (1986)
 Kovil Yaanai (1986)
 Hemavin Kadhalargal (1985)
 Yemaatrathe Yemaaraathe (1985)
 Mayavi (1985)
 Savi (1985)
 Arthamulla Aasaigal (1985)
 Navagraha Nayagi (1985)
 Panam Pathum Seyyum (1985)
 Andha Oru Nimidam (1985)
 Visha Kanni (1985)
 Engal Kural (1985)
 Karupu Sattaikaran (1985)
 Unakkaga Oru Roja (1985)
 Nermai (1985)
 Veettukkari (1985)
 Padikkadha Pannaiyar (1985)
 Chidambara Rahasiyam (1985)
 Raman Sreeraman (1985)
 Sivappu Nila (1985)
 Navagraha Nayagi (1985)
 Unnai Thedi Varuven (1985)
 Chain Jayapal (1985)
 Pudhu Yugam (1985)
 Naagam (1985)
 Nalla Thambi (1985)
 Kalyanam Oru Kalkattu (1985)
 Rajathi Rojakili (1985)
 Alai Osai (1985)
 Vesham (1985)
 January 1 (1984)
 Urimai Thedum Uravu (1984)
 Pei Veedu (1984)
 Nyayam (1984)
 Sirai (1984)
 Kadamai (1984)
 Idhu Enga Boomi (1984)
 Vai Sollil Veeranadi (1984)
 Naalai Unathu Naal (1984)
 Nandri (1984)
 Ezhuthatha Sattangal (1984)
 Niraparaadhi (1984)
 Sabaash (1984)
 Puyal Kadantha Bhoomi (1984)
 Kuzhandhai Yesu (1984)
 Marupatta Konangal (1984)
 Nooravathu Naal (1984)
 Raja Veettu Kannukkutty (1984)
 Vetri (1984)
 Aathora Aatha (1984)
 Urimai Thedum Uravu (1984)
 24 Mani Neram (1984)
 Ponmaalai Pozhudhu (1984)
 Vidhi (1984)
 Theerppu En Kaiyil (1984)
 Priyamudan Prabhu (1984)
 Madras Vathiyar (1984)
 Madurai Sooran (1984)
 Ilamai Kaalangal (1983)
 Muthu Engal Sothu (1983)
 Mella Pesungal (1983)
 Seerum Singangal (1983)
 Oru Odai Nadhiyagirathu (1983)
 Thalaimagan (1983)
 Ilayapiravigal (1983)
 Thanga Magan (1983)
 Azhagiya Laila (1982)
 Maarupatta Konangal (1982)
 Naan Kudithukonde Iruppen (1982)
 Mohana Punnagai (1981)
 Sathya Sundharam (1981)
  Sivappu Malli  (1981)
 Kuzhandhaiyai Thedi (1979)
 Ponnu Oorukku Pudhusu (1979)
 Kalikkoil Kabali (1979)

Malayalam

 Sunday 7 p.m. (1990)
 Prabhatham Chuvanna Theruvil (1989)
 Maharajavu (1989)
 Theruvu Narthaki (1988) as Radha
 Agnichirakulla Thumbi (1988)
 Karate Girls (1988)
 Bheekaran (1988) as Dancer
 Janma Shatru (1988) as Savithri Sankar
 Vamban (1987)
 Rajavembala  
 Ee Noottandile Maharogam (1987)
 Avalude Kadha (1987)
 Kalarathri (1987)
 Kaalathinte Sabhdam (1987) as Valsala
 Kulambadikal (1986)
 Pensimham (1986)
 Annoru Ravil (1986)
 Railway Cross (1986)
 Bharya Oru Manthri (1986)
 Sakhavu (1986)
 Karinagam (1986)
 Ardharathri (1986)
 Caberet Dancer (1986)
 Pournami Rathriyil (1986)
 Ithu Nalla Thamasha (1985) as Prasanna
 Uyerthezhunelppu (1985) as Shobha
 Shatru (1985)
 Jwalanam (1985)
 Puzhayozhukum Vazhi (1985) as Resmi
 Black Mail (1985) as Malu
 Aanakkorumma (1985) as Anitha
 Katturani (1985)
 Nerariyum Nerathu (1985) as Dancer
 Chorakku Chora (1985) as Chandrika
 Ezhu Muthal Onpathu Vare (1985)
 Revenge (1985) as Susan
 Kiratham (1985) as Anu
 Paurnami Raavil (1985)
 Jeevante Jeevan (1985)
 Shabadham (1984)
 Poomadhathe Pennu (1984) as Dancer
 Oru Sumangaliyude Katha (1984) as Sophia
 Mynakam (1984)
 Kurishuyudham (1984) as Dancer
 Vetta (1984) as Kombu
 Nishedi (1984)
 Rajavembala (1984) as Neelima
 Swarna Gopuram (1984) as Dancer
 Coolie (1983) as Sreedevi
 Attakkalasam (1983) as Usha
 Engane Nee Marakkum (1983) as Shanti
 Mortuary (1983)
 Arabikadal (1983)
 Passport (1983) as Daisy
 Himam (1983) as Dancer
 Belt Mathai (1983) as Geetha
 Samrambam (1983)
 Vaashi (1983)
 Aadhipathyam (1983)
 Oru Mukam Pala Mukham (1983) as Swapna
 Visa (1983) as Dancer
 Ente Kadha (1983)
 Veedu (1982) as Maggi
 Kaliya Mardhanam (1982) as Thulasi
 Aa Rathri (1982) as Dancer
 Thadakam (1982) as Dancer
 Love in Singapore (1980)
 Koumara Praayam (1979)
 Oolkatal (1979) as Thulasi
 Iniyaval Urangatte (1978)
 Thulavarsham (1976)

Kannada

 Kirataka (2011)
 Praja Prabhuthva (1989)
 Hongkongnalli Agent Amar (1989)
 December 31 (1988)
 Olavina Aasare (1988)
 Shubha Milana (1987)
 Sangrama (1987)
 Bete (1986)
 Kadina Raja (1985)
 Naanu Nanna Hendthi (1985)
 Baddi Bangaramma (1984)
 Mooroovare Vajragalu (1984)
 Mooru Janma (1984)
 Jiddu (1984)
 Simha Gharjane (1983)
 Gandugali Rama (1983)
 Prachanda Kulla (1982)
 Lakshmi Kataksha (1981)

Hindi
 Machalti Jawani (1989)
 Pyaar Karke Dekho (1987)
 Balidaan (1985)
 Haisiyat (1984)

Telugu
 Maya Bazaar (2010)
Ajatha Satruvu (1989) as Lalasa
 Hanthakudi Veta (1987)
 Dharmapatni (1987)
 Punnami chandrudu (1987)
 Cow Boy No. 1 (1986)
 Aakrandana (1986)
 Vikram (1986)
 Khooni (1985)
 Gandharvya Kanya (1979)
 Love in Singapore (1980)

Oriya
 Chakadola Karuchi Leela (1990)

Voice artist
For Nagma in the 2001 film Citizen.

Television

References

External links
 Anuradha at MSI
 

Living people
20th-century Indian actresses
Actresses in Tamil cinema
Actresses in Malayalam cinema
Indian film actresses
21st-century Indian actresses
Actresses from Tamil Nadu
Actresses in Odia cinema
Actresses in Telugu cinema
Actresses in Hindi cinema
Actresses in Kannada cinema
Year of birth missing (living people)
Actresses in Tamil television
Actresses in Telugu television